Outside Your Room is the fourth EP by English shoegaze band Slowdive. Its title is taken from the lyrics of the song "Alison", which was also a single from their album Souvlaki. It reached No. 69 in the UK Singles Chart.

Track listing
"Alison" (Neil Halstead) – (3:51)
"So Tired" (Neil Halstead) – (4:04)
"Souvlaki Space Station" (Slowdive) – (5:59)
"Moussaka Chaos" (Slowdive) – (6:24)

References 

Slowdive albums
1993 EPs
Creation Records EPs